Football 7-a-side at the 1986 International Cerebral Palsy Games was held in . Football 7-a-side is played by athletes with cerebral palsy, a condition characterized by impairment of muscular coordination, stroke, or traumatic brain injury (TBI).

Football 7-a-side was played with modified FIFA rules. Among the modifications were that there were seven players, no offside, a smaller playing field, and permission for one-handed throw-ins. Matches consisted of two thirty-minute halves, with a fifteen-minute half-time break.

Participating teams and officials

Teams

Venues
The venues to be used for the World Championships were located in Gits.

Format

The first round, a group stage, was a competition between the 6 teams divided among two groups of three, where each group engaged in a round-robin tournament within itself. The two highest ranked teams in each group advanced to the knockout stage for the position one to four, the lower ranked team had the position 5. Teams were awarded two points for a win and one for a draw. When comparing teams in a group over-all result came before head-to-head.

In the knockout stage there were two rounds (semi-finals and the final). The winners plays for the finals, the losers for third place. For any match in the knockout stage, a draw after 60 minutes of regulation time was followed by two 10 minute periods of extra time to determine a winner. If the teams were still tied, a penalty shoot-out was held to determine a winner.

Classification
Athletes with a physical disability competed. The athlete's disability was caused by a non-progressive brain damage that affects motor control, such as cerebral palsy, traumatic brain injury or stroke. Athletes must be ambulant.

Players were classified by level of disability.
C5: Athletes with difficulties when walking and running, but not in standing or when kicking the ball.
C6: Athletes with control and co-ordination problems of their upper limbs, especially when running.
C7: Athletes with hemiplegia.
C8: Athletes with minimal disability; must meet eligibility criteria and have an impairment that has impact on the sport of football.

Teams must field at least one class C5 or C6 player at all times. No more than two players of class C8 are permitted to play at the same time.

Group stage
In the group stage have seen the 6 teams divided into two groups of three teams.

Group 1

Group 2

Knockout stage

Semi-finals
Position 1-4

Finals
Position 3-4

Final

Statistics

Ranking

See also

References

External links
Cerebral Palsy International Sports & Recreation Association (CPISRA)
International Federation of Cerebral Palsy Football (IFCPF)

1986 in association football
1986
1986–87 in Belgian football
Paralympic association football
CP football